Memo-posting is a term used in traditional computerized banking environments where batch processing is employed. It represents temporary credit or debit transactions/entries made to an account for which the complete posting to update the balance will be done as part of EOD (end-of-day) batch processing. The temporary transaction created as part of the memo-posting will be reversed/removed after the actual transaction is posted in batch processing. Some modern banking systems implement real-time posting.

Examples:
A customer receives an electronic credit to his account with the current day as the effective date. The actual transaction for this entry will be made at EOD in batch posting. In order for him to access the electronic credit for which he is eligible, the bank creates a temporary "memo" credit to increase the balance available (withdrawal). Later, this entry will be removed as part of the EOD batch process.

The actual transaction to record a withdrawal using ATM will be posted to accounts in the EOD batch. In order to prevent a customer from overdrawing his account later in the day, the amount of the cash withdrawal is memo-posted as a charge to his account until the transaction actually posts in the batch update that evening.

References

Banking
Accounting terminology